The Making of Music is a BBC Radio 4 60-part documentary series on the history of Western classical music from plainsong to the present day.  It consists of excerpts from the pieces discussed and a narration written and presented by James Naughtie.  It is broadcast in 15-minute episodes on weekdays at 3.45pm, and followed up at 4pm by a 1-hour programme on BBC Radio 3 with full performances of some of the relevant works.

The first series of 30 episodes began on 4 June 2007, and was released on CD on 16 July 2007.  The second series was broadcast later in the same year, and released on CD in October 2007.

External links
 Radio 4 homepage
 Radio 3 homepage

BBC Radio 3 programmes
BBC Radio 4 programmes
2007 radio programme debuts
British classical music radio programmes
Radio documentaries about music